The Cyclo-cross Superprestige is a season-long cyclo-cross competition, consisting of around 8 rounds throughout the season in Belgium and the Netherlands. It is one of three season-long competitions, alongside the UCI Cyclo-cross World Cup and the X²O Badkamers Trophy (formerly known as the DVV Trophy, BPost Bank Trophy, and Gazet van Antwerpen trophy).

The first Superprestige took place in 1982–1983 and was won by Hennie Stamsnijder of the Netherlands. The Superprestige is organised by trade teams, not national teams as is found in the UCI Cyclo-cross World Cup.

Two riders managed to win all 8 Superprestige races in one season, Sven Nys in 2006–07 and Mathieu van der Poel in 2018–19. The 2022–2023 season only contains 7 races due to the race in Gieten being removed from the calendar.

Winners

Men

Women

External links
 

 
Cyclo-cross races
Cycle races in Belgium
Cycle racing series
Recurring sporting events established in 1983
1983 establishments in Belgium